The  was an infantry division of the Imperial Japanese Army. It was formed on 10 July 1945 in Dunhua as a triangular division. It was one of eight simultaneously created divisions, together with the 134th,  135th, 136th, 137th, 138th, 139th,  148th and 149th divisions. The nucleus for its formation were the 77th, 79th, and 80th transport guard units.

Action
At the end of July 1945, the men detached from 79th division were used to form the assault (raiding, airborne) battalion. The 139th Division was disarmed on 22 August 1945 without having seen any action during the Soviet invasion of Manchuria.

See also
 List of Japanese Infantry Divisions

Notes and references
This article incorporates material from Japanese Wikipedia page 第139師団 (日本軍), accessed 11 July 2016
 Madej, W. Victor, Japanese Armed Forces Order of Battle, 1937–1945 [2 vols], Allentown, PA: 1981.

Japanese World War II divisions
Infantry divisions of Japan
Military units and formations established in 1945
Military units and formations disestablished in 1945
1945 establishments in Japan
1945 disestablishments in Japan